The men's road race at the 1960 UCI Road World Championships was the 27th edition of the event. The race took place on Sunday 14 August 1960 in Hohenstein, East Germany. The race was won by Rik Van Looy of Belgium.

Final classification

References

Men's Road Race
UCI Road World Championships – Men's road race
1960 Super Prestige Pernod